The 2015 Crown Royal Presents the Jeff Kyle 400 at The Brickyard, the 22nd running of the event, was a NASCAR Sprint Cup Series race held on July 26, 2015 at the Indianapolis Motor Speedway in Speedway, Indiana. Contested over 164 laps – extended from 160 laps due to a green–white–checker finish – on the 2.5 mile (4 km) asphalt rectangular oval, it was the 20th race of the 2015 NASCAR Sprint Cup Series season. Kyle Busch won the race, his fourth of the season. Joey Logano finished second, while Kevin Harvick, Martin Truex Jr., and Denny Hamlin rounded out the top five.

Carl Edwards won the pole and led 20 laps on his way to a 13th-place finish. Harvick led a race high of 75 on his way to a third-place finish. The race had 16 lead changes among six different drivers, as well as nine caution flag periods for 36 laps.

This was the Busch's 33rd career victory for, fourth of the season, third consecutive and his first at the Indianapolis Motor Speedway. This was also the fourth win at the track for Joe Gibbs Racing. His victory moved him to 32nd in the points standings, 23 points back of Justin Allgaier for the 30th-place Chase cutoff and 483 points back of Harvick. Despite being the winning manufacturer, Toyota left the Brickyard trailing Chevrolet by 80 points in the manufacturer standings.

The Crown Royal 400 was carried by NBC Sports on the cable/satellite NBCSN network for the American television audience. The radio broadcast for the race was carried by the IndyCar Radio Network and Sirius XM NASCAR Radio.

Report

Background

The Indianapolis Motor Speedway, located in Speedway, Indiana, (an enclave suburb of Indianapolis) in the United States, is the home of the Indianapolis 500 and the Brickyard 400.

Kevin Harvick entered the Brickyard with a 69-point lead over Joey Logano. Dale Earnhardt Jr. entered 79 back, Jimmie Johnson entered 88 back, and Martin Truex Jr. entered 106 back.

New aero package
On July 7, NASCAR announced that a higher drag aero package would be used for the weekend's race. The changes to the cars included a nine-inch spoiler, one-inch wicker bill, 43-inch radiator pan and a two-inch leading edge for the splitter.

Changes to qualifying
In lieu of knockout qualifying, the weekend's race used the single-car qualifying method that's also used at Daytona and Talladega.

Entry list
The entry list for the Brickyard 400 was released on Friday, July 17 at 9:28 a.m. Eastern time. Forty-six cars were entered for the race. All but one was entered the previous week's race at New Hampshire. Chase Elliott attempted to make his fourth career start in the No. 25 Hendrick Motorsports Chevrolet. Josh Wise drove the No. 32 Go FAS Racing Ford. Brian Scott returned to the seat of the No. 33 Hillman-Circle Sport LLC Chevrolet. Michael McDowell made his first entry since Kentucky in the No. 95 Leavine Family Racing Ford. Jeff Gordon, tied with Michael Schumacher for all-time winningest driver at Indianapolis, made his 22nd and final career start at the Brickyard.

Practice

First practice

Second practice
Less than three minutes into the session, the hood of Denny Hamlin's car snapped up and smashed his windshield. No significant damage was sustained and he returned to finish twelfth in the session.

Final practice
Early in the session, Timmy Hill crashed into the barrier before the entrance to pit road.

Qualifying

"Just to be here racing is cool and with all the work the guys put in yesterday, we started out terribly and we were really slow. Just proud of everybody for digging deep. Darian (Grubb, crew chief) and these guys have done a great job. TRD, Toyota and everybody has put a lot of effort in and to have Stanley Tools on the pole for the Brickyard 400, this is cool.” "Overall from where we have been this weekend to what we picked up today I am proud of what my Shell Pennzoil team has done," Joey Logano said after qualifying second. "We have a good piece. I look forward to the race tomorrow. Clean air is king. If we can get a good start and settle in and click some laps off and run our strategy we can be there in the end." "Unfortunately that wasn’t the one that paid, but that got us in the second round which was the important part," Tony Stewart said after qualifying fourth. "The second round we were a little bit freer than we were the first round. I was a little busy inside the car. We got that track bar adjuster and I was moving it around quite a bit during the lap.”

Qualifying results

Race

First half

Start
The race was scheduled to start at 3:39 p.m. Eastern time, but started at 3:42 when Carl Edwards led the field to the green flag. He wouldn't lead the first lap, as he lost the lead to Joey Logano exiting turn 2. Edwards pulled up on Logano exiting turn 4 and took the lead for the first time on lap 12. Kevin Harvick was able to pull to within half a second of the leader several of times, but Edwards was able to pull away. Harvick hit pit road for the first time on lap 28, leading to the first round of green flag pit stops. Most of the field had made their stops while Edwards still continued to stay out. He and his teammate Kyle Busch hit pit road on lap 32 and the lead was given to Harvick. Austin Dillon was tagged for speeding on pit road and was forced to serve a drive-through penalty. He was tagged again for speeding while serving and was forced to serve another penalty.

Second quarter
Debris on the backstretch brought out the first caution of the race on lap 44. The debris was a pair of orange balloons caught on the backstretch catch fence. Logano opted not to pit and regained the lead as Harvick made his pit stop.

The race restarted on lap 50. The second caution flew the same lap when Clint Bowyer, exiting turn 4, got loose and spun down into the grass and Jeff Gordon, trying to avoid him, overcorrected and hit the wall in turn 4, creating a two-car crash. “I was underneath Kasey Kahne and we were just racing for position,” Gordon explained. “I saw (Clint) Bowyer get sideways. I don’t know what caused it. Me and Kasey were trying to check up to avoid it. I don’t know if he got loose or we just both got loose together. Then I just lost control and got in the wall.”

The race restarted on lap 55. Logano gave up the lead on lap 62 to pit and handed it back to Harvick. Danica Patrick gave up fifth to pit on lap 84. Harvick pitted from the lead on lap 84 and handed it to Brad Keselowski, who gave up the lead to pit the next time by and handed it to Kyle Busch. Debris on the front stretch brought out the third caution of the race on lap 90. Harvick opted not to pit and retook the lead.

Second half

Halfway
The race restarted on lap 97. The fourth caution of the race flew on lap 107 when Aric Almirola got loose, slid down the backstretch, and hit with the inside wall. A number of cars behind Harvick opted to pit under caution.

The race restarted on lap 112. The fifth caution of the race flew with 40 laps to go when Brian Scott got loose and slammed the wall exiting turn 2. Everyone but Brad Keselowski, David Ragan, Tony Stewart, and Kasey Kahne opted to pit. Harvick was one of those drivers who opted to pit, and this gave the lead to Keselowski.

Fourth quarter
The race restarted with 36 laps to go. David Ragan shot ahead of Keselowski going into turn 1 to take the lead with 35 laps to go. He pitted with 34 laps to go and handed the lead back to Keselowski. Debris on the backstretch brought out the sixth caution of the race with 20 laps to go. That debris was a piece of Justin Allgaier's tire. Keselowski opted to pit under caution, giving the lead back to Harvick.

The race restarted with 14 laps to go. The seventh caution of the race flew with 13 laps to go when Dale Earnhardt Jr. got pushed into the grass in turn 1, came back up, and spun out.

The race restarted with eight laps to go. Kyle Busch got the jump on Harvick to pass him in turn 1 and take the lead with seven laps to go. Debris in turn 2 brought out the eighth caution of the race with six laps to go. That debris came from Casey Mears's car.

The race restarted with two laps to go. The ninth caution of the race flew when Trevor Bayne got rear-ended and went into the wall while going into turn 1 at the restart.

Green-white-checker finish

The race restarted with two laps to go at a green-white-checkered finish. Busch shot ahead of Logano and drove off to score his 33rd career victory and his first at the track.

Post-race

Driver comments

“It’s really a treat to win here at Indy,” Busch said. “I appreciate all the fans that I have, all the fans that NASCAR has and Toyota has now captured a win at every single active Cup Series race track – that’s pretty awesome for us to be able to do that. I can’t thank this crew enough. Everyone at Joe Gibbs Racing, all the men and women there, you work so hard and pour your hearts into it. I can’t thank everyone that has stood behind me all year.”

“Yeah, I thought overall the day went well,” Logano said. “You know, you come to Indy, it's all about the win, either win or finish last. It doesn't really matter anywhere in between. At least that's the way I race when we come to a racetrack like this, Daytona and Indy. It's all about getting trophies and rings and making out with bricks. Unfortunately we come up a little bit short.”

“You always want to put yourself in position for a win at the end and that’s what we did today,” Truex said after finishing fourth. “We fought hard and stayed patient all day. We got caught on pit road again when the caution came out, but fortunately we had enough time to get back to the front. We had good cars the past four races but had horrible luck. Today it came together and it’s a good feeling to regain momentum.”

After being passed for the lead on the final lap of the previous day's Xfinity Series race, Ryan Blaney rebounded to finish twelfth. "It was a good run for us," he said of the Indy run. "I wish things played out a little better for us in the end, but it wasn't too bad when we finally got track position. That was so huge today. I thought when we got a little bit of clean air, we were pretty good. But it was hard to get that. We were in a good spot for that last restart but it really didn't go our way. I was wanting to get some help and the 2 car [Brad Keselowski, who finished tenth] really didn't help us out. But I'm really proud of these guys. After starting 30th, we worked our way up there and I can't thank them enough."

Media comments

Members of the NASCAR media gave their thoughts on the aero package used for this race. Pete Pistone, lead writer for the Motor Racing Network and co-host of The Morning Drive on Sirius XM NASCAR Radio, described the race as having "the same flavor as most Brickyard 400s at Indianapolis."

Jim Utter of Motorsport.com also said it "didn’t look all that different than Brickyards of the past and not at all like the predictions (or hopes) of lots of “pack racing” and drafting."

Dave Moody expressed that the race "wasn't any worse, but it wasn't much better, either."

Jenna Fryer of the Associated Press was more critical of NASCAR's decision to use a higher downforce package saying that "the route NASCAR followed has failed, and the series is stubbornly staying the course despite the results."

Speaking on behalf of the sanctioning body on The Morning Drive on Sirius XM NASCAR Radio Monday morning, NASCAR Vice Chairman Mike Helton explained to Mike Bagley and Pete Pistone that NASCAR has been making these changes "to build the most competitive type of motorsports we can build. We want our product on the racetrack to be pleasing to the fans and that means close competition." But he also said that they're "digesting the signs from it" and that they'll "take time" dissecting the results of the package.

Race results

Race statistics
16 lead changes among 6 different drivers
9 cautions for 36 laps
Time of race: 3 hours, 6 minutes, 51 seconds
Average speed: 
Kyle Busch took home $424,191 in winnings

Race awards
 Coors Light Pole Award: Carl Edwards (49.056)
 3M Lap Leader: Kevin Harvick (75 laps)
 American Ethanol Green Flag Restart Award: Joey Logano
 Duralast Brakes "Bake In The Race" Award: Kevin Harvick
 Freescale "Wide Open": Kevin Harvick
 Ingersoll Rand Power Move: Sam Hornish Jr. (9 positions)
 MAHLE Clevite Engine Builder of the Race: Hendrick Engines #4
 Mobil 1 Driver of the Race: Kevin Harvick (135.5 driver rating)
 Moog Steering and Suspension Problem Solver of The Race: Brad Keselowski (crew chief Paul Wolfe (0.120 seconds))
 NASCAR Sprint Cup Leader Bonus: No winner: rolls over to $170,000 at next event
 Sherwin-Williams Fastest Lap: Carl Edwards (Lap 2, 50.317)
 Sunoco Rookie of The Race: Matt DiBenedetto

Media

Television
NBC Sports covered the race. Rick Allen, Jeff Burton, and Steve Letarte had the call in the booth for the race. Dave Burns, Mike Massaro, Marty Snider, and Kelli Stavast handled pit road for the television side.

Radio
IndyCar Radio Network had the radio call for the race, which was simulcast on the Performance Racing Network and Sirius XM NASCAR Radio. Doug Rice, Pat Patterson, and former NASCAR drive John Andretti called the race from the Pagoda as the field was racing down the front stretch. Mark Jaynes called the race from atop the stands outside turn 1 when the field was racing through turn 1. Jake Query called the race from atop the turn 2 stands when the field was racing through turn 2. Rob Albright called the race from atop the turn 3 stands when the field was racing through turn 3. Chris Denari called the race from atop the turn 4 stands when the field was racing through turn 4. Brad Gillie, Brett McMillan and Nick Yeoman worked pit road for the radio side.

Standings after the race

Drivers' Championship standings

Manufacturers' Championship standings

Note: Only the first sixteen positions are included for the driver standings.

References

Brickyard 400
Brickyard 400
NASCAR races at Indianapolis Motor Speedway